The 2015–16 Radford Highlanders men's basketball team represented Radford University during the 2015–16 NCAA Division I men's basketball season. The Highlanders, led by fifth year head coach Mike Jones, played their home games at the Dedmon Center and were members of the Big South Conference. They finished the season 16–15, 9–9 in Big South play to finish in seventh place. They lost to Presbyterian in the first round of the Big South tournament.

Roster

Schedule

|-
!colspan=9 style="background:#ff0000; color:#ffffff;"| Regular season

|-
!colspan=9 style="background:#ff0000; color:#ffffff;"| Big South tournament

References 

Radford Highlanders men's basketball seasons
Radford
Radford
Radford